Cock o' the Walk can refer to:

Cock o' the Walk (1930 film), an American film
Cock o' the Walk (1935 film), an American film
Cock o' the Walk (1953 film), a Mexican film

See also
Cock-of-the-rock, a type of bird native to South America